The 1954 WANFL season was the 70th season of the most prestigious Australian rules football state competition in Western Australia. Eight teams competed in the league, the same as the previous twelve seasons. The season began with the first home-and-away round played on Saturday, 24 April, and concluded with the 1954 WANFL Grand Final on Saturday, 9 October.  defeated minor premiers  by 78 points, marking the club's 8th premiership and third in succession.

Premiership season

Round 1

Round 2

Round 3

Round 4

Round 5

Ladder

Grand final

References

External Links
 
 

West Australian Football League seasons
WANFL